HMS Barrosa (D68) was a later or 1943  fleet destroyer of the Royal Navy.

Design and construction
The Battle-class was developed as a result of operational experience in the early years of the Second World War, which had shown that the Royal Navy's existing destroyers had inadequate anti-aircraft protection, and in particular, lacked a modern dual-purpose main gun armament, capable of dealing with both surface targets and air attack, with guns lacking the high elevation mountings necessary to deal with dive bombers. The resulting design was armed with two twin 4.5 inch high-angle gun-turrets of a new design mounted forward and a heavy close-in anti-aircraft armament, with 16 Battle-class destroyers ordered under the 1942 construction programme.

For the 1943 construction programme, 24 Battle-class destroyers of a revised design (known as "1943 Battles") were ordered, with four destroyers (Barrosa, Talavera and Trincomalee) to be built by the Scottish shipbuilder John Brown & Company.

Displacement was  standard and  full load.

Two twin 4.5 inch (113 mm) Mark IV gun mounts, capable of elevating to 85 degrees, were mounted forward, while a single 4.5 inch gun, elevating to 55 degrees was fitted behind the funnel - this fifth gun, which could fire astern, replaced a 4-inch gun fitted to the 1942 Battles used for firing Star shell and could be controlled by the main fire control system. Close-in anti-aircraft armament was eight Bofors 40 mm gun, with two twin stabilised STAAG mounts, with integrated fire control, aft, one simple Mark V twin mount amidships, and two single mounts on the bridge wings. Two quintuple 21 inch (533 mm) torpedo-tubes were fitted, with a Squid anti-submarine mortar aft.

Barrosa,  named after the Battle of Barrosa, which took place in 1811 between British-Allied forces and France, and which ended in a French defeat. was one of six 1943 Battles ordered on 10 March 1943. The destroyer was laid down by John Brown at their Clydebank shipyard as Yard number 615 on 28 December 1943, launched on 17 January 1945 and completed on 14 February 1947.

Operations
On commissioning, Barrosa joined the 4th Destroyer Flotilla of the Home Fleet, but later in the year, a manpower shortage caused most of the Flotilla, including Barrosa to be laid up in reserve. Barrosa returned to active duties with the 4th Flotilla in 1948. On 12 November 1949, Barrosa collided with the oiler , damaging some of the destroyer's portholes and causing a small split in her hull.  In April 1950, Barrosa was placed in Reserve, as part of a wider transfer of destroyers to reserve with Loch-class frigates being returned to active service to improve the Royal Navy's anti-submarine capability.

In June 1953, Barrosa took part in the Coronation Fleet Review at Spithead in honour of the newly crowned Queen Elizabeth II. Barrosa spent much of her time in the Mediterranean, duties including anti-arms smuggling patrols off Cyprus.

In November 1956 Barrosa formed part of the Royal Navy force deployed in the eastern Mediterranean during the Suez Crisis, as part of the 4th Destroyer Squadron.

Refit and conversion to radar picket
On 15  March 1959, Barrosa collided with her sister ship  in the Bay of Biscay. Later that year, Barrosa entered an extensive programme of modification to become a radar picket, with the addition of the Sea Cat missile, as well as new anti-aircraft weaponry and new radar. In 1963 Barrosa joined the 8th Destroyer Squadron, based in the Far East, before joining the 24th Escort Squadron. As well as radar picket duties, tasks included operations against pirates, and on 10 February 1963, Barrosa intercepted a pirate boat, with a gun battle occurring between Barrosa s search party and the pirates, with one of the destroyer's crew killed. The ship also carried out anti-infiltration patrols during the Indonesia–Malaysia confrontation.

In March 1967, at the start of her final commission, Barrosa was used in attempts to break up the oil spill from the supertanker Torrey Canyon, which had run aground off Cornwall, with detergent. In November 1967, she formed part of a naval task force deployed to cover the British Withdrawal from Aden. Other duties during this last commission included taking part in the Beira Patrol. On 2 October 1968, Barrosa took the Royal Fleet Auxiliary stores ship Lyness in tow after Lyness engine had broken down east of Shetland, stopping the supply ship from being driven onto rocks until power could be restored.

In December 1968 Barrosa was decommissioned and was listed for disposal in 1972. By 1974 Barrosa was being used as a storage hulk at Portsmouth. She arrived at Blyth in Northumberland for scrapping on 1 December 1978.

References

Publications
 
 
 
 
 
 
 
 
 

 

Battle-class destroyers of the Royal Navy
Ships built on the River Clyde
1945 ships
Cold War destroyers of the United Kingdom